Deals (previously stylized as DEAL$) was an American chain of discount variety stores owned by Dollar Tree. The chain operated more than 221 stores located in shopping centers, malls (until 2015), and urban areas in 19 states throughout the United States.

Each store stocked a variety of products including national, regional, and private-label brands, and accepted manufacturers' coupons. Departments found in a Deals store included health and beauty, food and snacks, party, seasonal décor, housewares, glassware, dinnerware, household cleaning supplies, candy, toys, gifts, gift bags and wrap, stationery, craft supplies, teaching supplies, and books. The majority of Deals stores also sold frozen foods and dairy items such as milk, eggs, pizza, ice cream, frozen dinners, and pre-made baked goods.

History
Tom Holley owned the local Grandpa's chain in St. Louis, which he sold in November 1999 to Value City so he could open additional Deal$ stores after the first few proved successful. It eventually evolved into a chain of 41 discount dollar stores located from Missouri to Ohio. Later acquired by SuperValu on May 20, 2002, Deal$ had grown to 53 stores. And finally by March 29, 2006, Dollar Tree, Inc. acquired all Deal$ stores from SuperValu Inc, now 138 outlets.

On March 1, 2016, Dollar Tree re-branded most of the company's Deals stores as Dollar Tree stores. The conversion of Deals' stores was done as part of the parent company's acquisition of Family Dollar. The remaining 5 Deals stores were converted to Family Dollar stores.

Since 2018, some Dollar Tree locations formerly Deals began to close, many of them were located in the Northern United States.

Website
In 2013, Deals launched a full e-commerce website, deals-stores.com, to sell merchandise in both single items and larger quantities to individuals, small businesses, and organizations. The website was also used to advertise in-store events, specials, seasonal promotions, and featured products. As a part of its re-branding in 2016, it now redirects to Dollar Tree's website.

References

External links
Official Website

Chesapeake, Virginia
Defunct companies based in Virginia
Defunct companies based in Missouri
Defunct discount stores of the United States
American companies established in 1999
Retail companies established in 1999
Retail companies disestablished in 2016
Variety stores
2006 mergers and acquisitions
1999 establishments in Missouri